Scythris fissurella is a moth of the family Scythrididae. It was described by Bengt Å. Bengtsson in 1997. It is found in Cape Verde (Brava), Kenya, Sudan, Yemen, Oman, Pakistan, Afghanistan and Iran. Records from Russia (Astrakhan region) and Kazakhstan refer to the related S. niemineni.

The larvae feed on Aerva javanica.

References

 , 1997: Scythridids found by H. Hacker in Pakistan 1988 and India 1992. Esperiana 4:467–481.

fissurella
Moths described in 1997